Conus fumigatus, common name the smoky cone, is a species of sea snail, a marine gastropod mollusk in the family Conidae, the cone snails and their allies.

Like all species within the genus Conus, these snails are predatory and venomous. They are capable of "stinging" humans, therefore live ones should be handled carefully or not at all.

Description
The size of the shell varies between 30 mm and 69 mm.

Distribution
This species occurs in the Red Sea off Ethiopia; in the Libyan part of the Mediterranean Sea (as an introduced species).

References

 Bruguière J.G. (1789–1792). Encyclopdie méthodique ou par ordre de matières. Histoire naturelle des vers. Pancoucke, Paris. Vol. 1, part 1, p. 1–344 [June 1789]; Vol. 1, part 2, p. 345–758 [13 Feb. 1792; dates after N. EVENHUIS, 2003, Zootaxa, 166: 37; Zootaxa, 207]; Atlas pl. 1–189 [1791]; pl. 190–286 [1797] pl. 287–390 [1798] pl. 391–488
 Puillandre N., Duda T.F., Meyer C., Olivera B.M. & Bouchet P. (2015). One, four or 100 genera? A new classification of the cone snails. Journal of Molluscan Studies. 81: 1–23

External links
 The Conus Biodiversity website
 Cone Shells – Knights of the Sea
 

fumigatus
Gastropods described in 1792